Justice Barrows may refer to:

Chester W. Barrows, associate justice of the Rhode Island Supreme Court
William G. Barrows, associate justice of the Maine Supreme Judicial Court

See also
Charles Barrow, associate justice of the Texas Supreme Court